Friedel Berges (23 October 1903 in Darmstadt – 13 August 1969 in Darmstadt) was a German swimmer who competed in the 1928 Summer Olympics.

References

1903 births
1969 deaths
German male swimmers
German male freestyle swimmers
Olympic swimmers of Germany
Swimmers at the 1928 Summer Olympics
Sportspeople from Darmstadt
European Aquatics Championships medalists in swimming
20th-century German people